Opening for Steinbeck (Live) is the second live album released by John Craigie. The album was recorded during Craigie's shows at Mississippi Studios and The Doug Fir in Portland, Oregon in December 2017.

The first single off the album, "Presidential Silver Lining" was premiered by Glide Magazine on February 9, 2018. The album was released on March 16, 2018.

Track listing

Personnel 
John Craigie - guitar, vocals, harmonica

John Sheski & Juniana Lanning - Mixing and engineering

Adam Gonsalves - Mastering

References

2018 albums
John Craigie (musician) albums